William II (1307 – 26 September 1345) was Count of Hainaut from 1337 until his death. He was also Count of Holland (as William IV) and Count of Zeeland. He succeeded his father, Count William I of Hainaut. While away fighting in Prussia, the Frisians revolted. William returned home and was killed at the Battle of Warns.

Life
William was born in 1307, the son of William I of Hainaut and Joan of Valois. In 1334, he married Joanna, Duchess of Brabant, the daughter and heiress of John III, Duke of Brabant, but had no issue. He fought in France as an ally of the English (He was the brother-in-law of King Edward III of England.) He besieged Utrecht, because his one-time favorite bishop, John van Arkel of Utrecht, had turned against him. In 1339, William participated in the Siege of Cambrai (1339).

William fought against the Saracens, and went on crusade with the Teutonic Order in Prussia. He was killed near Stavoren, during one of the battles of Warns against the Frisians in 1345.

William was succeeded by his sister, Margaret of Hainaut, who was married to Louis IV, Holy Roman Emperor. Hainaut, Holland and Zeeland became a part of the imperial crown domains.

References

Sources

See also 
 Counts of Hainaut family tree
 Counts of Holland family tree
 Friso-Hollandic Wars

1307 births
1345 deaths
Avesnes family
Counts of Holland
Counts of Hainaut
Military personnel killed in action
14th-century people of the Holy Roman Empire